The Men's 200m backstroke event at the 2010 South American Games was held on March 26, with the heats at 10:37 and the Final at 18:23.

Medalists

Records

Results

Heats

Final

References
Heats
Final

Butterfly 200m M